Daniel Muñoz may refer to:

 Daniel Muñoz (actor) (born 1966), Chilean actor
 Daniel Muñoz (footballer) (born 1996), Colombian footballer
 Daniel Muñoz (cyclist) (born 1996), Colombian cyclist
 Daniel Muñoz de la Nava (born 1982), Spanish tennis player
 Daniel Muñoz (singer), contestant on Deutschland sucht den Superstar
 Daniel Muñoz (archer) (born 1989), Colombian compound archer